Saint-Pierre-d'Aurillac is a commune in the Gironde department in Nouvelle-Aquitaine in southwestern France. Saint-Pierre-d'Aurillac station has rail connections to Agen, Langon and Bordeaux.

Population

See also
Communes of the Gironde department

References

Communes of Gironde